Tany Sun Hong (born February 3, 1931) is an American attorney and judge in the state of Hawaii. He served as Attorney General of Hawaii from 1981 to 1984, under governor George Ariyoshi. He later served as a judge on the Hawaii District Court's first circuit, appointed by chief justice Herman Lum. Hong was born in Makawao, Maui, Hawaii. He earned a bachelor's degree at the University of Hawaiʻi in 1956 and his law degree from Gonzaga University in 1967, and prior to serving as attorney general, was the director of Hawaii's Department of Regulatory Agencies.

References

1931 births
Living people
University of Hawaiʻi at Mānoa alumni
Gonzaga University School of Law alumni